The emu-wrens (Stipiturus) are a genus of passerine birds in the Australasian wren family, Maluridae. They are found only in Australia, where they inhabit scrub, heathland and grassland. They are small birds, 12–19 cm long with the tail accounting for over half of their length. The tail has only six feathers which are loose and coarse in structure, rather like the feathers of the emu. Three species are recognised, of which the mallee emu-wren is endangered.

Taxonomy and systematics
The common name of the genus is derived from the resemblance of their tails to the feathers of an emu. The genus was defined by French naturalist René Lesson in 1831 after his visit to Port Jackson on the 1823-5 voyage of the Coquille, although the southern emu-wren had already been encountered and described soon after European settlement at Sydney Cove. The three species have been variously considered as one, two or even four species (as the Western Australian subspecies westernensis of the southern emu-wren also considered a species at one point. Their closest relative, based on allozyme studies, appears to be the orange-crowned fairywren of the monotypic genus Clytomyias from the mountains of New Guinea.

Species 
There are three recognised species in the genus:

Ornithologist Richard Schodde has proposed that the southern emu-wren is the ancestral form from which the other two species have evolved.

Description
Emu-wrens exhibit sexual dimorphism, the males have brownish plumage with rufous crowns of varying intensity, and a sky blue throat and upper chest. The females lack the blue coloration and are predominantly reddish brown above and paler below. Their most distinctive feature is their long tails, composed of six filamentous feathers, the central two longer again. The tail is double the body length in the case of the southern and rufous-crowned species. They weigh from 5.4 g in the case of the smallest, the rufous-crowned, to 7.5 g of the southern emu-wren.

Distribution and habitat
The three species of emu-wrens each live in distinct habitats: the southern emu-wren preferring marshes and heathland, the mallee emu-wren inhabiting spinifex understory in mallee woodland, and the rufous-crowned emu-wren dwelling in spinifex in desert areas.

Behaviour and ecology 
Emu-wrens are fairly secretive and hard to spot, living in low shrub cover. They are predominantly insectivorous, but supplement their diet with seeds. Their furtive behaviour and brown colour has resulted in them being mistaken for bush mice. They exhibit a weak but distinctive flight pattern with the tail feathers drooping noticeably.

References

Cited text

 Del Hoyo, J.; Elliot, A. & Christie D. (editors). (2007). Handbook of the Birds of the World. Volume 12: Picathartes to Tits and Chickadees. Lynx Edicions. 
Pizzey, Graham & Knight, Frank (1997) The Graham Pizzey & Frank Knight Field Guide to the Birds of Australia, HarperCollins, London, UK.

Maluridae
Taxa named by René Lesson
Taxonomy articles created by Polbot